John Peter Barnes (March 15, 1881 – April 10, 1959) was a United States district judge of the United States District Court for the Northern District of Illinois.

Education and career

Born in Beaver County, Pennsylvania, Barnes received a Bachelor of Science degree from Geneva College in 1904 and a Bachelor of Laws from the University of Michigan Law School in 1907. He was in private practice in Chicago, Illinois from 1907 to 1913. He was a first assistant county attorney of Cook County, Illinois from 1913 to 1914, thereafter returning to his private practice until 1931.

Federal judicial service

On February 26, 1931, Barnes was nominated by President Herbert Hoover to a new seat on the United States District Court for the Northern District of Illinois created by 46 Stat. 1417. He was confirmed by the United States Senate on March 2, 1931, and received his commission on March 4, 1931. He served as Chief Judge from 1948 to 1957, assuming senior status on September 15, 1957, and resigning the bench altogether on December 31, 1958.

Last years and death

Barnes was also a basset hound breeder, and was co-owner of Barook Kennels from 1957 until his death on April 10, 1959, in Elgin, Illinois.

References

Sources
 

1881 births
1959 deaths
Judges of the United States District Court for the Northern District of Illinois
United States district court judges appointed by Herbert Hoover
20th-century American judges
University of Michigan Law School alumni
People from Elgin, Illinois
People from Beaver County, Pennsylvania
Geneva College alumni